Crane Company Building is a historic warehouse building located at Charlotte, Mecklenburg County, North Carolina. It was built in 1928, and is a two-story, reinforced concrete building.  The building has a flat roof with parapet, brick curtain walls and steel window frames and stairs.

It was added to the National Register of Historic Places in 2001.

References

Commercial buildings on the National Register of Historic Places in North Carolina
Commercial buildings completed in 1928
Buildings and structures in Charlotte, North Carolina
National Register of Historic Places in Mecklenburg County, North Carolina
1928 establishments in North Carolina